Mitch Escanellas (born 19 June 1973) is a Puerto Rican fencer. She competed in the women's individual épée event at the 1996 Summer Olympics.

References

External links
 

1973 births
Living people
Puerto Rican female fencers
Olympic fencers of Puerto Rico
Fencers at the 1996 Summer Olympics